Louisville, which is now a ghost town, was a mining camp in El Dorado Canyon near the Techatticup Mine in the Eldorado Mining District, of New Mexico Territory.   The camp was probably named for Nat S. Lewis, the superintendent of the Techatticup Mine in the 1860s, and camp doctor.

References

Ghost towns in Clark County, Nevada
Mining communities in Nevada
Nevada Territory
1860s in Nevada
Former populated places in Nevada
1861 establishments in Nevada Territory
Populated places established in 1861